Takapau is a small rural community in the Central Hawkes Bay in New Zealand.  It is located 20 kilometres west of Waipukurau, off State Highway 2, and has a population of more than 500.

The original township was founded in 1876 by farmer Sydney Johnston from Oruawharo station. Johnston's family donated land for a school and churches, and built the local library, public hall and, later, Plunket rooms. Many streets are named after members of the family.

Takapau was once the centre of a large flax milling industry, and the community takes its name from the flax that grew in the expansive Takapau plains. The Māori word translates literally as "mat" or "carpet".

The largest business in Takapau is now the Silverfern Farms meat-processing plant, founded by the Hawke's Bay Farmers’ Meat Company in 1981. Kintail Honey, one of country's largest honey-packing and beekeeping operations, is also based in the town.

There are two schools in Takapau. The Trappist monastery, the Southern Star Abbey, is also located nearby.

Demographics
It is part of the larger Makaretu statistical area.

Takapau had a population of 597 at the 2018 New Zealand census, an increase of 72 people (13.7%) since the 2013 census, and an increase of 81 people (15.7%) since the 2006 census. There were 216 households, comprising 309 males and 288 females, giving a sex ratio of 1.07 males per female, with 126 people (21.1%) aged under 15 years, 102 (17.1%) aged 15 to 29, 261 (43.7%) aged 30 to 64, and 99 (16.6%) aged 65 or older.

Ethnicities were 71.9% European/Pākehā, 41.7% Māori, 2.5% Pacific peoples, 3.0% Asian, and 1.5% other ethnicities. People may identify with more than one ethnicity.

Although some people chose not to answer the census's question about religious affiliation, 54.8% had no religion, 29.1% were Christian, 4.5% had Māori religious beliefs, 0.5% were Hindu, 0.5% were Muslim, 1.5% were Buddhist and 2.5% had other religions.

Of those at least 15 years old, 33 (7.0%) people had a bachelor's or higher degree, and 150 (31.8%) people had no formal qualifications. 24 people (5.1%) earned over $70,000 compared to 17.2% nationally. The employment status of those at least 15 was that 234 (49.7%) people were employed full-time, 51 (10.8%) were part-time, and 18 (3.8%) were unemployed.

Marae
The local Rongo o Tahu Marae is a tribal meeting ground for the Ngāti Kahungunu hapū of Ngāi Toroiwaho.

Education

Railway station 

Takapau had a railway station from 12 March 1877 to 27 September 1981. It was the terminus of the line from Spit for 10 months, until 25 January 1878, when the extension to Kopua opened. Takapau at that time was on the northern edge of the Seventy Mile Bush.

Edmund Allan and Samuel Kingstreet had a £14,100 contract to build the  extension of the Napier to Waipukurau railway south to Takapau. They built a 5th class station in 1875 and Donald McLeod, a Waipukurau carpenter, built a goods shed and platform in 1877. Initially, only one train a day ran from Takapau. In 1890 there were two trains a day. There was a post office at the station from 1887 to 1911. By 1896 there were  x  and  x  goods sheds and also a cart approach, loading bank, cattle yards, stationmaster's house, urinals and a passing loop for 24 wagons, extended to 55 in 1911 and further extended in 1940. In 1905 a verandah was added and the platform extended. Electric lights were installed in 1921. Railway houses were built in 1928 and 1946.

On 27 September 1981 the old station closed and a new station and loop line opened near Oruawharo,  to the east. The loop is still in use, with sidings linking to the Silver Fern Farms works and a platform and shelter remain, which appear weed-grown in  a 2015 photo. There has been no regular passenger train since at least 1995. There is now only a single line passing through the original Takapau station site.

References

Central Hawke's Bay District
Populated places in the Hawke's Bay Region